is a district in the borough Hamburg-Mitte, in the eastern part of Hamburg, Germany. In 2020 the population was 37,903.

History

During World War II Hamburg and, therefore, Horn were targets of the air raids of the so-called Operation Gomorrah.

Geography
Horn is located in the eastern part of the city of Hamburg and belongs to the Hamburg-Mitte borough. To the north you will find the district of Marienthal, part of the Wandsbek borough, and the district of Billstedt is located to the east. To the west are the districts of Hamm-Nord, Hamm-Mitte and Hamm-Süd; to the south is the district of Billbrook.

Demographics
In 2007 the population of the Horn quarter was 36,890. In 1999 there were 19.604 households, and 51% of all households were made up of individuals. The average household size was 1.82.

In 2007 there were 4,237 criminal offences (115/1000 people).

Population by year

Politics
These are the results of Horn in the Hamburg state election:

Education
In 2006 there were 5 elementary schools and 5 secondary schools in Horn totalling 3,894 pupils.

Sport 
The Deutsches Derby is a Group 1 flat horse race at the Hamburg-Horn Racecourse, the Horner Rennbahn, scheduled to take place each year in July.

Infrastructure

Health systems
In 2007 there were 16 day-care centers for children, 44 physicians in private practices and 8 pharmacies.

Transportation

Horn is serviced by the rapid transit system of the underground railway with the stations: Horner Rennbahn and Legienstraße (line U2 since the Change of the Lines). According to the Department of Motor Vehicles (Kraftfahrt-Bundesamt), there were 9,310 private cars registered (252 cars/1000 people) in Horn in 2007 with 131 traffic accidents being recorded.

Notes

References

 Statistical office Hamburg and Schleswig-Holstein Statistisches Amt für Hamburg und Schleswig-Holstein, official website

External links

Quarters of Hamburg
Hamburg-Mitte